Louis Favoreu (September 5, 1936 – September 1, 2004) was a French academic, specialized in public law, and a jurist. He was born in Lucq-de-Béarn (Pyrénées-Atlantiques) and died in Aix-en-Provence (Bouches-du-Rhône). He was also a law professor, a senior faculty member and President of Paul Cézanne University.

References

Bibliography

Books

Articles in journals

External links

1936 births
2004 deaths
Academic staff of Aix-Marseille University
French jurists